Yardzhilovtsi is the largest village in Pernik, Bulgaria. It is situated on the Pernik - Trun road and 40 km. east of the Serbian border. The world weightlifting champion Yoto Yotov is a native of the village.

The village's carnival troop is famous around the world and a constant in international carnivals with its vibrant dress, traditions and temper.

References

Villages in Pernik Province